Norah Carter (15 April 1881 – 8 February 1966) was a New Zealand photographer. Her work is held in the permanent collection of the Museum of New Zealand Te Papa Tongarewa.

Early life 
Carter was born on 15 April 1881, to Anna Margaret Begg and Richard Carter, a customs inspector who was stationed in Napier at the time. She studied drawing and art at Wellington Technical School and in Melbourne, Australia.

Career 
In 1907, Carter opened a studio in Christchurch, specialising in miniature painting and photography. In 1910, she moved to Gisborne, in the North Island of New Zealand, and opened a photographic studio there. She closed the business in 1919.

Carter died in Sydney, Australia, on 8 February 1966.

References

1881 births
1966 deaths
New Zealand photographers
New Zealand women photographers
New Zealand emigrants to Australia